Policy & Politics is a quarterly British peer-reviewed academic journal covering public policy and political science. It was established in 1972 and is published by the Policy Press of the University of Bristol. Its mission statement says that it "is committed to advancing our understanding of the dynamics of policy-making and implementation."

History 
The journal was established in 1972 by Macmillan Publishers with Bleddyn Davies (London School of Economics) as founding editor-in-chief. Publishing of the journal moved to SAGE Publishing in 1974, to the University of Bristol's School for Advanced Urban Studies in 1979, and to the Policy Press in 1996.

A conference celebrating the 40th anniversary of the journal was held in 2013. and its 50th anniversary year is due to be celebrated in 2022.

Abstracting and indexing
The journal is abstracted and indexed in:
Current Contents/Social & Behavioral Sciences
EBSCO databases
GEOBASE
International Bibliography of the Social Sciences
ProQuest databases
Scopus
Social Sciences Citation Index
According to the Journal Citation Reports, the journal had a 2020 impact factor of 3.75, ranking it in the top quartile (37th out of 182 journals) in the category "Political Science" and 13th out of 47 in the category "Public Administration".

References

External links

Political science journals
Policy analysis journals
Quarterly journals
Publications established in 1972
English-language journals
University of Bristol